Vexillum piceum is a species of small sea snail, marine gastropod mollusk in the family Costellariidae, the ribbed miters.

Description

Distribution
This marine species occurs off Hawaii.

References

External links
 Pease, W. H. (1865). Descriptions of new genera and species of marine shells from the islands of the Central Pacific. Proceedings of the Zoological Society of London. (1865): 512-517.

piceum
Gastropods described in 1860